Richard M. Suinn (born May 8, 1933) is an American psychologist, a past president of the American Psychological Association (APA) and a former mayor of Fort Collins, Colorado.

Biography
Suinn earned an undergraduate degree from Ohio State University and a PhD in counseling psychology from Stanford University. He served on the city council of Fort Collins, Colorado, then he became the city's mayor. He was APA president in 1999. He was the first Asian-American president of the APA. Suinn was also one of the founding members of the Asian American Psychological Association.

References

1933 births
Living people
Presidents of the American Psychological Association
Politicians from Fort Collins, Colorado